Hugh Jackman: Back on Broadway was a concert residency by Australian actor, singer, and producer Hugh Jackman. For this residency, Jackman performed Broadway and Hollywood musical numbers, backed by an 18-piece orchestra.

The show was directed and choreographed by Warren Carlyle.

Setlist

Act I
 Overture
 "Oh, What a Beautiful Morning"
 "One Night Only"
 Dance medley
 "L.O.V.E."
 "The Way You Look Tonight"
 New York medley
 "Fever"
 "Rock Island"
 "Soliloquy"

Act II
 "The Boy Next Door"
 Peter Allen medley
 "Tenterfield Saddler"
 Movie medley
 "Somewhere Over the Rainbow"
 "Mack the Knife"
 "It's So Hard to Say Goodbye"

Reviews
“The impossibly talented, impossibly energetic Mr. Jackman is a glorious dinosaur among live entertainers of the 21st century: an honest-to-gosh old-fashioned matinee idol who connects to his audiences without a hint of contempt for them or for himself.”
— The New York Times

“Whatever else he does, Jackman brings joy to the stage. Comparisons are being offered to the deep impression made by a solo artist such as [Judy] Garland. But the rapturous emotional intensity that lingers is not what this performer provides. Garland left blood on the stage. Jackman leaves sweat, and a smile.”
— The Washington Post

References

2011 concert residencies
2012 concert residencies
Hugh Jackman